Thomas John Hunter (1881–1928) was a Scottish footballer, who played as a defender for Liverpool and Preston North End.

External links
 LFC History profile

1881 births
Scottish footballers
Liverpool F.C. players
1928 deaths
Preston North End F.C. players
Beith F.C. players
Ayr Parkhouse F.C. players
Ayr United F.C. players
English Football League players
Association football defenders